Poovathakudi  is a village in the Aranthangirevenue block of Pudukkottai district, Tamil Nadu, India.

Demographics 

As per the 2001 census, Poovathakudi had a total population of 2,802 with 1,425 males and 1,377 females. Out of the total population 1,970 people were literate, or 70.3%.

References

Villages in Pudukkottai district